Limnaecia explanata is a moth in the family Cosmopterigidae. It is found in Zimbabwe.

References

Natural History Museum Lepidoptera generic names catalog

Endemic fauna of Zimbabwe
Limnaecia
Moths described in 1921
Taxa named by Edward Meyrick
Moths of Africa